Harpalus caspius is a species of black coloured ground beetle that can be found in the Near East and the Palearctic realm. In Europe, it can be found in such countries as Austria, Bulgaria, Czech Republic, Germany, Hungary, Moldova, Poland, Romania, Slovakia, Ukraine, all states of former Yugoslavia (except for Bosnia and Herzegovina and North Macedonia), and southern part of Russia. It is also found in such Asian countries as Armenia, Azerbaijan, Georgia and Turkey.

References

caspius
Beetles of Asia
Beetles of Europe
Beetles described in 1806